Aeogae station is a subway station on Line 5 of the Seoul Metropolitan Subway. The station is located in the Ahyeon neighborhood of Mapo District, Seoul. The name Aeogae is notable for being one of the few station names in the Seoul Metropolitan Subway not derived from Chinese. The station name is derived from a native Korean word meaning "small ridge" and is shared by the neighborhood where the station is located.

Station layout

References

Railway stations opened in 1996
Seoul Metropolitan Subway stations
Metro stations in Mapo District